Mahendra Adarsha is a town and Village Development Committee  in Bara District in the Narayani Zone of south-eastern Nepal. At the time of the 1991 Nepal census it had a population of 3,563 persons living in 655 individual households. The municipality is named after late king Mahendra.

References

External links
UN map of the municipalities of Bara District

Populated places in Bara District